Nakasato may refer to:

Places
Nakasato, Aomori, town located in Kitatsugaru District in western Aomori Prefecture, Japan
Nakasato, Niigata, village located in Nakauonuma District, Niigata Prefecture, Japan
Nakasato Station (Iwate), railway station on the Iwaizumi Line in Miyako, Japan, operated by East Japan Railway Company (JR East)
Nakasato Station (Nagano), railway station on the Koumi Line, East Japan Railway Company (JR East), in Nagatoro in the city of Saku, Nagano
Tsugaru-Nakasato Station, railway station on the Tsugaru Railway Company's Tsugaru Railway Line located in the town of Nakadomari, Aomori Prefecture, Japan

People with the surname
, Japanese politician
, Japanese women's footballer

See also
Nakazato (disambiguation)

Japanese-language surnames